Pascal Pédemonte (born 27 January 1980 in Lyon) is a French football (soccer) defender. Currently, he plays in the Championnat de France amateur for AS Lyon Duchère.

External links

1980 births
Living people
French footballers
Association football defenders
Olympique Lyonnais players
CS Sedan Ardennes players
Stade Lavallois players
Tours FC players
AS Moulins players
Lyon La Duchère players
Footballers from Lyon
Ligue 1 players
Ligue 2 players